The junior varsity basketball team at the University of North Carolina is a two-year program that gives non-scholarship students the opportunity to continue their basketball careers at the collegiate level. Tryouts for the J.V. team occur every year prior to the beginning of basketball season in October. Players are only allowed to play on the J.V. team for two years and then they are given a chance to try out for the varsity team as a walk-on. With a valid physical examination, any student that attends the university can try out for the J.V. team. The J.V. team is coached by assistant varsity coaches, who are given the opportunity to gain head coaching experience while fulfilling their assistant duties at the varsity level. Hubert Davis, prior to his promotion to head coach for the varsity team, was the head coach of the J.V. team. Since the COVID-19 pandemic shut down sports in spring 2020, the J.V. team has not competed, putting a pause on one of the most cherished traditions in Chapel Hill. The team did not return for the 2021–22 season, and instead tryouts were held to add walk-ons to the varsity team, due to the continued need for COVID-19 safety protocols.

History of the program 
The J.V. team originated as a freshman team when scholarship freshmen were not allowed to play their first year as a student per NCAA rules. Following the 1972 NCAA rule change that made freshmen eligible for varsity action, the University of North Carolina kept its junior varsity team in place while most other schools across the nation disbanded their freshman teams.

Competition 
The J.V. team plays all of its games in the Dean Smith Center three hours before the varsity games take place. The schedule consists of between 14 and 18 regular season games. The J.V. team plays against area Division II and Division III teams as well as junior colleges, prep schools, and community colleges. No other men's basketball programs in the Atlantic Coast Conference field a J.V. team. The biggest rivals for the J.V. team are Hargrave Military Academy and Milligan College. The game is played per NCAA rules, but there is no NCAA Tournament or National Invitational Tournament for the J.V. team.

Notable coaches and alumni 
Roy Williams, the former head coach of the men's varsity basketball team at the University of North Carolina, coached the J.V. team for eight years while serving as an assistant for Dean Smith. Jerod Haase, the current head coach for the Stanford Cardinal men's basketball team, coached the J.V. team for three years while serving as an assistant to Williams. Current Tar Heel varsity head coach Hubert Davis also had a stint as head coach of the J.V. team while an assistant on Williams' bench. Phil Ford, the second-leading scorer in North Carolina history, also served as a coach for the J.V. team. The former head coach of the North Carolina Tar Heels baseball team, Mike Fox, played for the J.V. team in 1975 and 1976. Former Tar Heel assistant Doug Wojcik also served a stint as the J.V. coach. Three of the walk-ons for the 2008–09 national championship team, J. B. Tanner, Jack Wooten, and Patrick Moody (younger brother of Christian Moody), were graduates of the J.V. program.

Notes

External links
 

J